The Pan American Wrestling Championships is the continental wrestling championships for nations from North America, Central America, South America and the Caribbean. Three wrestling styles, recognized internationally by FILA, have been contested annually since the inception, namely: Greco-Roman, freestyle and Sambo wrestling. Since 1997 women's freestyle is also contested along with the mentioned styles.

History 
Since the inception, Sambo wrestling has been contested jointly with the Olympic wrestling styles. National teams, including the U.S. team, featured a number of veteran Sambo athletes, along with experienced international wrestlers who have decided to compete in Sambo. From the 1980s to 2000s saw the period of separation until the 2006, when FILA again took Sambo under its control, and the Pan American Sambo Championships were expected to be included at the 2006 Pan American Wrestling Championships in Rio de Janeiro, Brazil. The hosts in Brazil had difficulties that prevented the Sambo event to be included in the competition. USA Wrestling has agreed to host the Pan American Sambo Championships alongside its U.S. Sambo National Championships. In 2013 the Olympic styles and Sambo has been contested in Panama City, Panama. Following the inclusion of the Combat Sambo into the Pan American Sambo Championships programme, which isn't exactly a wrestling style, the two championships are being held separately.

Championships

Senior

Youth
Youth (Espoir) Pan American Wrestling Championships

Junior
Junior Pan American Wrestling Championships for athletes aged 17–20 years (U21) predates the Senior Championships by one year.

Cadet

U15

Team Championships
Pan American Team Championships

See also
 Wrestling at the Pan American Games
 Pan American Judo Championships

References

 
Wrestling competitions
International sports championships in the Americas
Recurring sporting events established in 1977